Malcolm John Edwards (born 3 December 1949) is a British editor and critic in the science fiction field. An alumnus of The Haberdashers' Aske's Boys' School, he received his degree from the University of Cambridge. He was Deputy CEO at the Orion Publishing Group up until 2015, when he stepped down to become the chairman of science fiction publishing house Gollancz. Edwards lives in London with his wife, the CEO of a public relations company.

Edwards has edited a number of publications including: Vector, the critical journal of the British Science Fiction Association, (from 1972 to 1974), and the science fiction anthology Constellations (Gollancz, 1980). He served as science fiction editor for Victor Gollancz Ltd, which later led to him launching the SF Masterworks series at Orion in 1999.

Edwards was at one time highly active in science fiction fandom. When he first began contributing to British science fiction fanzines, he was initially confused with "Malcolm Edwards", a pseudonym used several years earlier by Peter Weston. He was Director of the Science Fiction Foundation for much of the two decades it was at the North East London Polytechnic. He also served as initial Chairman of the 45th World Science Fiction Convention. He was a Guest of Honour at Loncon 3, the 72nd World Science Fiction Convention, from 14 to 18 August 2014.

Career
 1976–1989 Gollancz, started as staff copy-editor, ended as Publishing Director
 1989–1991 Grafton, Publishing Director
 1991–1997 HarperCollins Trade Division, Publishing Director, then Deputy Managing Director
 1998–2019 Orion Books, first as Managing Director of Orion Books, then Deputy Chief Executive and Group Publisher since September 2003, and as Chair of Gollancz from 2009
2019–now   Wellbeck Publishing Group, as Publisher of André Deutsch

As editor, Malcolm Edwards has worked with J. G. Ballard (he edited Empire of the Sun), Tom Clancy, Philip K. Dick, Stephen King, William Gibson, Robert Ludlum, James Patterson, Robert Holdstock, Terry Pratchett and many others.

Awards
 1996 British Book Awards: Imprint & Editor of the Year
 1983 BSFA Awards: Best Short Fiction (After Images)
2019 Alfie Awards: For Editing

References

External links
 
 

1949 births
Living people
Science fiction editors
British book editors
British speculative fiction critics
British speculative fiction editors
Male speculative fiction editors
Alumni of Christ's College, Cambridge
People educated at Haberdashers' Boys' School